Julian Mariano Noda Clariño (born August 15, 1995) is a Filipino professional footballer who plays as a defender for Illawarra Premier League club Bulli FC and the Philippines national team.

Collegiate career
Clariño played for the football team of his college, University of the Philippines in the UAAP. The team was mentored by Anto Gonzales.

Club career

Global
Together with his brother OJ, Clariño played for Global in the 2015 United Football League season.

Clariño made his league debut for Global in a 6–0 victory against Team Socceroo coming in as a substitute, replacing Izzeldin El Habib in the 88th minute of the match.

Meralco Manila
In 2016, Clariño was released by Global, he then joined fellow United Football League club, Meralco Manila (formerly Loyola Meralco Sparks).

Clariño made his debut for Meralco in an 11–0 victory against Agila MSA playing the whole 90 minutes.

In January 2018, it was announced that Meralco Manila have ceased operations. The management stated that they attempted to find investors to keep the club running but were unable to do so.

Davao Aguilas
In July 2018, during the mid-season transfer window, Clariño signed for Mindanao-based Philippines Football League club Davao Aguilas.

After the 2018 season, it was reported on December 14, 2018, that Davao Aguilas has withdrawn from the PFL. Reasons for the withdrawal is yet to be officially disclosed by club owner Jefferson Cheng who iterated continued support for infrastructure and grassroots development in Davao. He is set to discuss with the club's stakeholders over the fate of the club itself. Cheng has also cited the decision to hire Bernie Sumayao to manage the PFL despite his volunteering to take over the management of the league.

Stallion Laguna
In January 2019, Clariño joined Stallion Laguna after the folding of Davao Aguilas.

International career

Philippines U-21
In August 2014, Clariño received a call-up for Philippines U-21 to compete at the 2014 Hassanal Bolkiah Trophy that was held in Brunei.

Philippines U-23
In March 2015, Clariño received a call-up for Philippines U-23 to compete at the 2016 AFC U-23 Championship qualification that was held in Thailand. On 31 March 2015, he made his debut for the Philippines U-23 team in a 3–1 defeat against Cambodia U-23.

Clariño was part of the Philippines U-23 squad that competed in the 2015 SEA Games.

In July 2017, Clariño received a call-up for Philippines U-23 to compete at the 2018 AFC U-23 Championship qualification that was held in Cambodia.

Clariño was part of the Philippines U-22 squad that competed in the 2017 Southeast Asian Games held in Malaysia. Philippines finished fourth out of six in the group stage and failed to advance to the knockout rounds.

Philippines
In December 2017, he took part at the 2017 CTFA International Tournament though the squad that played in the friendly tournament in Taiwan was mentored by Marlon Maro in lieu of regular head coach Thomas Dooley. Clariño made his debut for the Philippines in a 3–1 win against Laos.

In October 2018, Clariño was once again called up for the Philippines, he was included in the final 21-man squad that will participate in the 2018 Bangabandhu Cup.

References

External links

 

1995 births
Living people
Association football defenders
Filipino footballers
Footballers from Metro Manila
F.C. Meralco Manila players
Global Makati F.C. players
Philippines international footballers
Sportspeople from Manila
University Athletic Association of the Philippines footballers
University of the Philippines alumni